Collins Center is a hamlet  in the town of Collins in Erie County, New York, United States.  The ZIP Code for Collins Center is 14035.

References

Hamlets in New York (state)
Hamlets in Erie County, New York